Devastator is the fifth studio album by American rock band Phantom Planet. It was released on June 18, 2020 by Gong Records and preceded by the singles "Balisong", "Party Animal", "Time Moves On" and "Only One". This is their first studio album in 12 years since Raise the Dead (2008). The album was originally scheduled to be released on May 8, 2020, but was pushed back to June 19, due to the COVID-19 pandemic. The release was later moved up one day earlier, as a sign of respect to the Black Lives Matter movement so it would not fall on the same day as Juneteenth.

Track listing

Personnel
Credits for Devastator adapted from Discogs.

Musicians

Phantom Planet
Alex Greenwald – lead vocals, rhythm guitar
Sam Farrar  – bass guitar, backing vocals
Darren Robinson – lead guitar, backing vocals
Jeff Conrad – drums

Production

Tony Berg – producer
Patricia Sullivan – mastering
Shawn Everett – mixing
Will Maclellan – engineer, mixing
Joseph Lorge – engineer, mixing

References

2020 albums
Phantom Planet albums
Albums postponed due to the COVID-19 pandemic